Betsey's Rock Falls is a waterfall in Wilkes County, North Carolina.

Geology
The falls is a long series of cascades beginning at Betsey's Rock, located near the headwaters of North Prong Lewis Fork in Wilkes County in North Carolina. The rock and falls were named for Betsey Pierce, a woman who lived there with her two children during the American Civil War growing and selling ginseng.

Visiting the falls
An overlook for Betseys Rock Falls is located 4.1 miles north of the parking area for Cascade Falls at milepost 267.8.  The waterfall is located across the drainage, but is difficult to see at any time other than winter after a heavy rain.

Nearby falls
Cascade Falls

References

Waterfalls of North Carolina
Landforms of Wilkes County, North Carolina